The following outline is provided as an overview of and topical guide to Nagaland:

Nagaland – state in Northeast India. It borders the state of Assam to the west, the state of Arunachal Pradesh and part of Assam to the north, Burma (now Myanmar) to the east and Manipur to the south. The state capital is Kohima, and the largest city is Dimapur.

General reference

Names 
 Common English name: Nagaland
 Pronunciation: 
 Official English name(s): Nagaland
 Nickname(s): 
 Adjectival(s):
 Naga
 Demonym(s): Nagas

Rankings (amongst India's states) 
 by population: 25th
 by area (2011 census): 26th
 by crime rate (2015): 29th
 by gross domestic product (GDP) (2014): 25th
by Human Development Index (HDI): 
by life expectancy at birth: 
by literacy rate:

Geography of Nagaland 
Geography of Nagaland
 Nagaland is: an Indian state, and one of the Seven Sister States
 Population of Nagaland: 1,980,602 (2011)
 Area of Nagaland: 16,579 km2 (6,401 sq mi)
 Atlas of Nagaland

Location of Nagaland 
 Nagaland is situated within the following regions:
 Northern Hemisphere
 Eastern Hemisphere
 Eurasia
 Asia
 South Asia
 India
 Northeastern India
 Seven Sister States
 Time zone:  Indian Standard Time (UTC+05:30)

Environment of Nagaland

Natural geographic features of Nagaland 
 Highest point: Mount Saramati

Regions of Nagaland

Ecoregions of Nagaland

Administrative divisions of Nagaland

Districts of Nagaland 
Districts of Nagaland
 Chümoukedima District
 Dimapur District
 Kiphire District
 Kohima District
 Longleng District
 Mokokchung District
 Mon District
 Niuland District
 Noklak District
 Peren District
 Phek District
 Shamator District
 Tseminyü District
 Tuensang District
 Wokha District
 Zünheboto District

Municipalities of Nagaland 
 Cities of Nagaland
 Capital of Nagaland: Kohima
 Chümoukedima
 Dimapur

Demography of Nagaland 

Demographics of Nagaland

Government and politics of Nagaland 
Politics of Nagaland

 Form of government: Indian state government (parliamentary system of representative democracy)
 Capital of Nagaland: Kohima
 Elections in Nagaland

Union government in Nagaland 
 Rajya Sabha members from Nagaland
 Nagaland Pradesh Congress Committee
 Indian general election, 2009 (Nagaland)
 Indian general election, 2014 (Nagaland)

Branches of the government of Nagaland 

Government of Nagaland

Executive branch of the government of Nagaland 

 Head of state: Governor of Nagaland, 
 Raj Bhavan – official residence of the Governor
 Head of government: Chief Minister of Nagaland,

Legislative branch of the government of Nagaland 

Nagaland Legislative Assembly

Judicial branch of the government of Nagaland 

 Gauhati High Court

Law and order in Nagaland 

 Law enforcement in Nagaland
 Nagaland Police

History of Nagaland 
History of Nagaland

History of Nagaland, by period

Prehistoric Nagaland

Ancient Nagaland

Medieval Nagaland

Colonial Nagaland

Contemporary Nagaland

History of Nagaland, by region

History of Nagaland, by subject

Culture of Nagaland 
Culture of Nagaland
 Architecture of Nagaland
 Cuisine of Nagaland
 Monuments in Nagaland
 Monuments of National Importance in Nagaland
 State Protected Monuments in Nagaland
 World Heritage Sites in Nagaland

Art in Nagaland 
 Music of Nagaland

People of Nagaland 
 Naga people
 People from Nagaland

Religion in Nagaland 
Religion in Nagaland
 Christianity in Nagaland

Sports in Nagaland 
Sports in Nagaland
 Cricket in Nagaland
 Nagaland Cricket Association
 Football in Nagaland
 Nagaland football team
 Wrestling in Nagaland
 Naga Wrestling Championship

Symbols of Nagaland 
Symbols of Nagaland
 State animal: Mithun
 State bird: Blyth's tragopan
 State flower: Rhododendron
 State seal: Seal of Nagaland
 State tree: Alder

Economy and infrastructure of Nagaland 
 Tourism in Nagaland

Education in Nagaland 
Education in Nagaland
 Institutions of higher education in Nagaland

Health in Nagaland 
 Health in Nagaland
 List of hospitals in Nagaland

See also 
 Outline of India

References

External links 

 State Portal of the Government of Nagaland

Nagaland
Nagaland